The 2022 Clemson Tigers baseball team were the varsity intercollegiate baseball team that represented Clemson University during the 2022 NCAA Division I baseball season. The Tigers competed in the Atlantic Coast Conference (ACC) and were led by seventh-year head coach Monte Lee.  Clemson played its home games at Doug Kingsmore Stadium in Clemson, South Carolina.

Infielder Max Wagner won ACC Player of the Year while leading the ACC in home runs, Slugging Percentage, and OPS.  Wagner was also named a First Team All-American by Collegiate Baseball.

The Tigers finished the season 35–23 overall and 13–16 in ACC Play, to finish in sixth place in the Atlantic Division.  As the twelfth seed in the ACC Tournament they were placed in pool A with first seed Virginia Tech and eight seed North Carolina.  They lost both games and were eliminated from the tournament.  They were not invited to the NCAA Tournament for the second consecutive year.  It was the first time the Tigers had missed the NCAA Tournament in consecutive years since 1982-1986.  It was their first time missing back-to-back tournaments since the field expanded to 64 teams in 1999.  At the end of the season, Lee was fired as the head coach.

Previous season
The Tigers finished the season 25–27 and 16–20 in ACC play to finish in fifth place in the Atlantic Division.  As the eleventh seed in the ACC Tournament they were placed in Pool B with second seed Georgia Tech and seventh seed Louisville.  The Tigers lost to Louisville and defeated Georgia Tech.  Their 1–1 record was not good enough to advance to the Semifinals and they were not invited to the NCAA Tournament.  The Tigers missed the NCAA Tournament for the first time since 2008 and just the second time since 1987.  This was also Clemson's first losing season since 1957.  It was also head coach Monte Lee's first time missing the NCAA Tournament as a head coach.

Personnel

Roster

Coaching Staff

Schedule

Note: All rankings shown are from D1Baseball Poll.

Rankings

2022 MLB Draft

References

Clemson Tigers baseball seasons
Clemson
Clemson baseball